The Denmark women's national rugby union team are a national sporting side of Denmark, representing them at rugby union. The side played their first test match in 2003 against the Netherlands.

History

Results summary
(Full internationals only)

Results

Full internationals

Other matches

See also
 Rugby union in Denmark

External links

European national women's rugby union teams
Rugby union in Denmark
R